Miles Robinson  may refer to:
Miles Robinson (cricketer) (1929–2002), English cricketer
Miles Robinson, a fictional member of the Sesame Street Robinson family
Miles Benjamin Anthony Robinson, singer-songwriter
Miles Robinson (soccer) (born 1997), American soccer player